Mille Soya (Buongiorno Italia) is a 2004 romantic musical film, written, produced and directed by Boodee Keerthisena. The film stars Mahendra Perera, Jackson Anthony, Sanath Gunathilake, Kamal Addararachchi, and Sangeetha Weeraratne. The film was released on 21 October 2004. The film received mostly positive reviews from critics.

The film is Sri Lanka's very first digital film. Shooting of the film was started in 1997 in Naples, Positano in Italy and in Chilaw in Sri Lanka. It is a Sri Lankan-Italian co-production.

The film follows a group of young Sri Lankan musicians who illegally immigrate to Italy in the baggage compartment of a bus and about the lost dreams of Sri Lankan youth living during the Sri Lankan civil war.

Plot 
The story revolves around a group of young musicians – rock 'n rollers who venerate Bob Marley and wish to become a famous band. But their lives on the lowest rungs of Sri Lankan society, with its poverty and violence, offer them little if no opportunities. Friends returning from Italy talk about the money to be made. But the journey there is not straightforward because it's not legal. The film follows them on their dangerous journey with all its hazards, its comradeship, its tears and laughter, and also death. When in Naples, Italy, the appalling conditions of their day-to-day living, the hard labor, but also the basic human frailties, strengths, loves and hates, are also shown. On returning to Sri Lanka, somehow they seem to be better equipped to survive either in Sri Lanka, or to return to Italy, this time as legal immigrants.

Cast 
 Mahendra Perera as Pradeep
 Sangeetha Weeraratne as Princy
 Jackson Anthony as Samson
 Kamal Addararachchi as Maxi
 Sanath Gunathilake as Sagara
 Ravindra Randeniya as Agent KingsLey
 Veena Jayakody as Pradeep's mother
 Sriyantha Mendis as Jude
 W. Jayasiri
 Suvineetha Weerasinghe as Maxi's Mother
 Roger Seneviratne as Michael
 Lakshman Mendis as Premasiri

Songs 

 Sudu Andumin performed by Jaya Sri
 Anjaleeka performed by Marians
 Ape Dawasak Enawamai performed by Jaya Sri (written in Sinhala to the melody of "No Woman, No Cry")
 Gantheere Gantheere performed by Kithsiri Jayasekara & Nirosha Virajini
 Salli Pokuru Mille Ahuru performed by Damian Wickramathilaka

References

External links 
 
 

2004 films
Sinhala-language films
Films set in Sri Lanka (1948–present)
2000s English-language films